Manfred Alois Segieth (born 7 July 1946), known by his stage name Fancy, is a German singer, songwriter, musician and record producer.

Early life 

Manfred Alois Segieth was born on 7 July 1946 in Munich. Fancy started playing guitar at the age of twelve. While attending a boarding school where the enjoyment of worldly music was not allowed, he had to secretly listen to the pop records of artists such as Ted Herold and Peter Kraus. At age 14, he switched to the humanistic high school in Munich. During and after high school, he worked in various bands as a guitarist and bass player, though he mainly performed as a singer. He performed  with these bands in numerous dance halls. However, his parents did not share Fancy's enthusiasm for music. His father had only changed his mind after recovering from a major operation.

Career 

Segieth's career commenced in 1984 as a European-based pop singer and songwriter. His role as a musician rapidly expanded as a producer, which lead to his music receiving worldwide airplay. The international disco hits "Slice Me Nice" and "Chinese Eyes" reached second place on the US Billboard Dance Charts and the Top 10 USA Billboard for 1985 with "Chinese Eyes" and "Come Inside". Fancy had a number 1 in Spain with "Bolero".  A further nine of his singles charted in both the top 10 and top 20 portions of the Media Control Singles Charts, this mainly covered the German charts during the mid to late 80s. "Flames of Love" has received worldwide exposure since 1988; as it was his highest-charting hit.

Fancy's work include many studio albums and singles as well as compilation and remixed CD's.

In 2009, Fancy founded the German Tiger Foundation, dedicated to improving the quality of life for zoo tigers. The foundation has since been dissolved.

Discography

Albums
 Get Your Kicks (1985)
 Contact (1985)
 Flames of Love (1988)
 All My Loving (1989)
 Five (1990)
 Six - Deep in My Heart (1991)
 Colours of Life (1996)
 Christmas in Vegas (1996)
 Blue Planet (1998)
 D.I.S.C.O. (1999)
 Strip Down (2000)
 Locomotion (2001)
 Voices from Heaven (2004)
 Forever Magic (2008)
 Masquerade (Les Marionettes) (2021)

Compilations and remixes

Singles

Citations

External links 

 
 
 

1946 births
20th-century German male singers
21st-century German male singers
German pop singers
German dance musicians
Eurodisco musicians
German Italo disco musicians
Living people
Musicians from Munich